Bernt Ivar Eidsvig, known after 1991 as Markus Bernt Eidsvig (born 12 September 1953), is a Norwegian prelate of the Catholic Church. He has been the Bishop of Oslo since 2005 and the Apostolic Administrator of the Roman Catholic Territorial Prelature of Trondheim from 2009 until 2019.

Early life 
Eidsvig was born and raised in Rjukan, Norway. He studied theology at the University of Oslo and planned to become a priest of the Norwegian Church. He took a theological degree there with the church's historic special task of Church and Society in the Chronicles of Barsetshire, a series of six novels by the English writer Anthony Trollope (1815-1882). He also worked for ten years as a freelancer for the newspaper Morgenbladet. He converted to Catholicism on 20 December 1977.

Arrest and imprisonment in Moscow 
On 14 July 1976, Eidsvig  was arrested by the KGB in Moscow while he was acting as a courier for the exiled Russian organization National Alliance of Russian Solidarists (NTS). His mission was to deliver leaflets, renal medicine and a handbook of "rebellion" to a Soviet Russian in Moscow who had requested these supplies. The intended recipient had been betrayed and arrested. When he arrived to make the delivery he was arrested by agents of the KGB and was held in Lefortovo Prison for 101 days, when Norwegian Foreign Minister Knut Frydenlund and Prime Minister Trygve Bratteli won his release.

The arrest attracted considerable attention both in Norway and internationally, much of which was negative. While he was still in prison, some reports–influenced by Soviet disinformation–made his efforts look foolhardy, even reporting that he had been handing out fliers on the street in Moscow. The Soviets used clippings of this sort from the Norwegian press, including the coverage in Aftenposten, to weaken his resistance under interrogation.

Clerical career 
After completing licentiate studies at Heythrop College in London, Eidsvig was ordained as a priest of Oslo Catholic Diocese of St. Olav's Cathedral in Oslo on 20 June 1982 by John Willem Gran, Bishop of Oslo. He served for a time in the military chaplain corps of the Norwegian Armed Forces, partly at Evjemoen north of Kristiansand and partly with the medic recruits' company in Bømoen by Voss. He then served as chaplain at St. Paul's in Bergen and on 1 January 1986 became pastor there. While pastor, he moved and expanded the Catholic school St. Paul Bergen. He was also a teacher at the school and was active in the language association Riksmålsforbundet. In the Catholic Diocese of Oslo, he served on the Priests' Council from 1983 to 1990, the Consultors' Council from 1987 to 1990, and the Pastoral Council from 1988 to 1991.

In the summer of 1991, Eidsvig was received as a novice by the Canons of Stift Klosterneuburg in Austria, just outside Vienna. He was invested with the religious habit on 27 August 1991, and received the name Mark. He made his profession of vows on 30 August 1995. He then worked from 1997 to 2003 as pastor of St. Leopold's Church in Klosterneuburg, and from 1996 at the monastery as master of novices. Under his leadership of the novitiate, the Stift Klosterneuburg took on a more international flavor, welcoming candidates from the United States, Germany, Norway, and Vietnam, the last by way of Norway as refugees. He has also been chapter counselor and chapter secretary of the Stift.

Bishop
Pope John Paul II appointed Eidsvig Bishop of Oslo on 11 July 2005. The announcement was delayed to the symbolic date of 29 July, the memorial day of Norway's patron saint, St. Olav. Eidsvig was the first Canon of Klosterneuburg to be appointed bishop since 1913, when the monastery Pastor Friedrich Gustav Piffl was appointed Archbishop of Vienna. On 22 October 2005, he received his episcopal consecration in the Lutheran Trinity Church, opened to the Catholic community by the Norwegian Church for the occasion, and then was installed in St. Olav Cathedral. The consecration mass was broadcast on the Internet (Web TV) via www.katolsk.no. Eidsvig is the third Norwegian-born Catholic bishop in Norway since the Reformation, after Olaf Offerdahl (consecrated 6 April 1930, died 7 October 1930) and John Willem Gran (consecrated 24 March 1963, died 20 March 2008).

He has also been a staff member of the Catholic journal St. Olav.

He was named Apostolic Administrator of the Territorial Prelature of Trondheim on 8 June 2009, upon the resignation of Bishop Georg Müller, which in 2010 he explained had come as the result of a charge of child sexual abuse against Müller. His term as Apostolic Administrator ended on 3 October 2020 with the consecration of the new Bishop–Prelate of Trondheim.

Fraud charge
On 26 February 2015, Eidsvig and the financial manager of the Catholic Diocese of Oslo were charged with felony fraud, after the diocese was reported on suspicion of registering people as members of the Roman Catholic Church in Norway without their knowledge or consent. The charges against Eidsvig were dropped in November 2016 when the other parties were brought to trial.

Coat of arms
Eidsvig coat of arms as a bishop is divided into four fields. 1. and 4 field (upper heraldic right and lower left quadrant), Oslo Catholic bishop arms (Olavsøksene, which are two axes, gold on red background), while the other two have half the arms of Klosterneuburg (T-cross upside down, silver on red background) combined with the flowering rod of Aaron (gold on blue background). Klosterneuburg arms are divided according to the rule that only the abbot (Dean) can use all the arms, while the bishops who belonged to the monastery uses half combined with another emblem. The shield is crowned with a green "prelathatt" (bishop's hat), which is a "galero" in Italian, with six green tassels on each side of a bishop's cross (this cross is mentioned in the Codex Iuris Canonici 1917, canon 274, § 6, and should not be confused with the usual processional cross). His motto is Labori non Honori, "work, not honor." It's the same motto as cardinal Piffl, Archbishop of Vienna, elected in 1913, it is the beginning of a motto in its entirety which reads "work, not honor, to my effort to be devoted." This is a reproduction (not a verbatim quote) of this sentiment expressed in St. Augustine's writings.

Honours
Eidsvig was in 2014 made a knight commander with star of the Order of the Holy Sepulchre.

Bibliography 
 101 dager hos KGB, Oslo 1977
The book provides a detailed description of prison conditions and the KGB personnel's interrogative and investigative methods, as Eidsvig experienced them. Eidsvig also comments on the television interview he had to contribute to before his release, and on the press conference he participated in after arriving home in Norway. (The title translates as "101 days at the KGB".)
 Valfart til Lourdes: Et katolsk tilbud til soldater og befal (editor with Roar Haldorsen), Oslo: Unge norske katolikkers forbund, 1982
This is a brief publication mentioning the annual organized military pilgrimage to Lourdes (in France), and how interested (Norwegian) soldiers or officers may get to participate in it.
 "Den katolske kirke vender tilbake", in Den katolske kirke i Norge (editors: John W. Gran, Erik Gunnes, Lars Roar Langslet), Oslo 1993
This was a key contribution in a historical overview, published on the occasion of the 150-year anniversary of the Catholic Church's return to Norway in 1843.

References

External links 
 Bishop Bernt Eidsvig's biography on katolsk.no (written in Norwegian)
 Stift Klosterneuburg
 Recording (video) by Eidsvig episcopal ordination on 22 October 2005
 Catholic Hierarchy profile

1953 births
Living people
People from Rjukan
University of Oslo alumni
Morgenbladet people
Norwegian people imprisoned abroad
Prisoners and detainees of the Soviet Union
Norwegian military chaplains
Converts to Roman Catholicism from Lutheranism
21st-century Roman Catholic bishops in Norway
Alumni of Heythrop College
Norwegian expatriates in Austria